Apterocerina necta is a species of ulidiid or picture-winged fly in the genus Apterocerina of the family Ulidiidae.

References

Ulidiidae